IGrigorios Emmanouil (12 September 1912 – 1994) was a Greek rower. He competed at the 1948 Summer Olympics and the 1952 Summer Olympics.

References

1912 births
1994 deaths
Greek male rowers
Olympic rowers of Greece
Rowers at the 1948 Summer Olympics
Rowers at the 1952 Summer Olympics
Place of birth missing